Kim Kwan-yong (born November 29, 1942) is the governor of Gyeongsangbuk-do Province, Republic of Korea. He was also the mayor of Gumi from 1995 to 1997, serving again in 2006. He is a member of the Grand National Party.

Education
He graduated from Daegu Teachers' School in 1961. He received his BS in Economics from Yeungnam University in 1969. He received an honorary Doctorate of Engineering from Kumoh National Institute of Technology in 1998. He received a master's degree from the Graduate School in public administration of Yeungnam University in 2001.

Career
From 1961 to 1967 Kim worked as an elementary school teacher in Gumi, Gyeongsangbuk-do. In 1989 he became Superintendent of Gumi Tax Office. From 1991 to 1993 he was an Administrative Officer(Secy) to the President for civil affairs. In 1995 he was elected Mayor of Gumi, serving until 1997, and then later again in 2006. In 1999 he was appointed Honorary Professor of Shenyang Industry University in China. On 1 July 2006 he became the 29th Governor of the Province of Gyeongsangbuk-do. In 2010 he was reelected as Gyeongsangbuk-do(North Gyeongsang Province) governor, with 75.4 % of the vote. On 2 June 2010 he was reelected again. On 1 July 2010 he was sworn in as Governor of Gyeongsangbuk-do at the Inauguration Ceremony of the EXPO Park in Gyeongju.

Honours
1998  Awarded the Konrad Adnauer Self-Governing Organization Prize
2000  Awarded the 7th BPW Gold Award from Business & Professional Women's Clubs of Korea
2003  Awarded for excellence in local self-government management from KMA
2004  Awarded the Grand Prix in leadership category at the national productivity innovation competition

External links
Gyeongsangbuk-Do > Provincial Government > Governor
 https://www.koreatimes.co.kr/www/news/nation/2010/06/113_66976.html

1942 births
Living people
People from Gumi, North Gyeongsang
South Korean Roman Catholics
Yeungnam University alumni
Liberty Korea Party politicians
Mayors of places in South Korea
Governors of North Gyeongsang Province